Harrison Clay Bailey (born November 1, 2001) is an American football quarterback for the UNLV Rebels. Bailey started his collegiate career with the Tennessee Volunteers.

High school career 
Bailey attended Marietta High School. As a senior, Bailey threw for 50 touchdowns and 10 interceptions on 411 attempts for 4,674 yards. He led his team to a 14–2 record and a state championship. Bailey was rated as a 4-star recruit and was ranked 99th in his class. Bailey chose to go to Tennessee over Alabama, Georgia, and Ohio State. He enrolled at Tennessee in January 2020.

College career

Tennessee 
Bailey appeared in six games in his freshman season. He made his first start against Florida on December 5, 2020. In this game, the Gators defeated Bailey and the Volunteers 31–19. In this game Bailey threw for one touchdown and was 14 for 21 passing. The following week, Bailey earned his first win as a starter against rival Vanderbilt. He passed for 207 yards and two touchdowns in the 42–17 victory.  As a starter, Bailey went 1–2. He passed for 578 yards, four touchdowns, and two interceptions on the 2020 season.

Tennessee head coach Jeremy Pruitt was fired during the offseason bringing in new head coach Josh Heupel. The coaching change brought transfers Hendon Hooker and Joe Milton to Tennessee. Bailey was the backup and played in one game against Tennessee Tech. On October 27, 2021, Bailey announced his decision to transfer.

UNLV 
On January 19, 2022, Bailey announced he would be transferring to UNLV. Bailey made his first start with UNLV against Nevada, throwing for 209 yards and two touchdowns in a 27–22 victory on November 26.

References

External links 
 UNLV Rebels bio
 Tennessee Volunteers bio

Living people
2001 births
Tennessee Volunteers football players
Sportspeople from Georgia (U.S. state)
20th-century American people
American football quarterbacks
UNLV Rebels football players